Blastobasis thyone is a moth in the  family Blastobasidae. It is found in Costa Rica.

The length of the forewings is about 5.6 mm. The forewings have brown scales tipped with pale brown intermixed with brown and pale-brown scales. The hindwings are translucent pale brown.

Etymology
The specific epithet refers to Thyone, mother of Bacchus.

References

Moths described in 2013
Blastobasis